The Linguini Incident (also released on home video as Houdini and Company, The Robbery, Shag-O-Rama) is a 1991 American cult crime comedy film set in New York starring David Bowie and Rosanna Arquette. The film was directed by Richard Shepard, who co-wrote the script with Tamar Brott. The name refers to linguini, a type of pasta.

Plot
A British bartender, Monte (David Bowie), wishes to marry a waitress at the restaurant he works, ostensibly so he can get his green card. Waitress and aspiring escape artist, Lucy (Rosanna Arquette), and hopeful lingerie designer Vivian (Marlee Matlin), wish to rob Monte's and Lucy's employer in order to fund their ambitions. Monte agrees to help the duo rob the restaurant so long as Lucy marries him. While the robbery does not go precisely according to plan, the trio are successful. However, Lucy accidentally leaves Monte at the altar, causing him to lose a two million dollar bet with the restaurant owners that he could marry a waitress in a week. In a double or nothing scenario, Monte wagers Lucy's skills as an escape artist. He tricks the women into playing along, claiming that the bosses found out about the robbery. The women appear to forgive him for lying about the circumstances of the escape performance. The two women rob the restaurant a second time. The relationship of the women and Monte remains ambiguous in the end.

Cast
 David Bowie as Monte
 Rosanna Arquette as Lucy 
 Marlee Matlin as Jeanette
 Eszter Balint as Vivian
 Buck Henry as Cecil
 Viveca Lindfors as Miracle
 Andre Gregory as Dante
 Kathy Kinney as Denise
 James Avery as Phil
 Al Berry as Bread Man
Iman and Julian Lennon have brief cameos in the movie.

Production and release
The movie was shot in late 1990, after Bowie had completed his Sound+Vision Tour. It was co-funded by Bowie's own production company, Isolar. The film was released in America on the weekend of the Rodney King Riot. In Los Angeles, where the LA TIMES had called the film "an off the wall treat" there was a curfew so box office was obviously disappointing despite the fact that The NY Times called the film a "cheerfully bizarre comedy". It was released on VHS in 1992, and again in January 2000 on DVD with the name Shag-O-Rama, The Robbery', and "Houdini and Company." 

Critical response
While reviews were mixed, many critics praised the film for its humor and avant-garde surrealism. Janet Maslin of The New York Times wrote that the film "trumpets its eccentricity with its title and casting, as well as in every other way it can". Similarly, Los Angeles Times Staff Writer, Kevin Thomas, called the film "a rarity, a contemporary screwball comedy that actually works". Contrastly, Empire magazine gave the movie 1 star out of 5, calling it "an unbearably protracted dud", while TV Guide gave the movie 2 stars out of 5. Variety'' magazine called the movie an "uninspired, poverty row production" and lamented the miscasting of Bowie in the lead role. Bowie biographer Nicholas Pegg called the movie "harmless but negligible", with a "misconceived script and turgid direction."   

Since its initial release, the film has garnered a cult following of fans who've come to appreciate its bizarre humor, surreal tone, and relative obscurity. On October 4, 2022, Collider called it "a hidden gem in Bowie's filmography" and "the best kind of cinematic comfort food". In March of 2020, film reviewer Virginie Pronovost wrote "it keeps you entertained from the beginning until the end with its humour, its peripeties and the overall aura of excitement". Affirming fan appreciation for the film's obscurity, one 2013 review from Mutant Reviewers says "here on my Island of Misfit Movies, The Linguini Incident lives on in a special place of honor".

See also
List of films featuring the deaf and hard of hearing

Notes

External links
 
 
 

1991 films
American heist films
American crime comedy films
Films about bartenders
Films set in New York City
Films scored by Thomas Newman
Films about magic and magicians
1990s crime comedy films
1991 comedy films
Films directed by Richard Shepard
1990s English-language films
1990s American films